"853-5937" is a song by English rock band Squeeze released on the band's 1987 album Babylon and On. Released as the fourth UK single and the second US single from the album, "853-5937" was a moderate chart hit in both nations, reaching number 91 in the UK and climbing to number 32 on the US Hot 100 chart and number 38 on US Cash Box chart.

Background
"853-5937" was written by Glenn Tilbrook and Chris Difford. The song began life as an answering machine jingle that Tilbrook used, with 853-5937 being Tilbrook's phone number at the time. Despite the song's commercial success, both Tilbrook and Difford have commented on their dislike for the song and have blocked the song from appearing on compilation albums. Difford recalled, "It's a very lame song. I liked it at the time, but you change your mind about how you feel about certain songs."

Music Video
The music video shows many black and white clips, as well as the band performing in what appears to be the inside of a telephone, as they are surrounded by oversized electronics and circuitry. Bassist Keith Wilkinson can be seen playing an Ormston fretless bass.

Track listing

7"
 "853-5937" (3:21)
 "Tough Love" (3:06)

12"
 "853-5937" (3:21)
 "Tough Love" (3:06)
 "853-5937 (Bonus Buff mix)" (3:26)

7" (North American release)
 "853-5937" (3:21)
 "Take Me I'm Yours (live)" (4:03)

See also
 "867-5309/Jenny"
 "634-5789 (Soulsville, U.S.A.)"

References

Squeeze (band) songs
1988 singles
Songs written by Glenn Tilbrook
Songs written by Chris Difford
1987 songs
A&M Records singles
Songs about telephone calls